Skyward is a software company specializing in K–12 school management and municipality management technologies, including student management, human resources, and financial management. Skyward is partnered with more than 1,900 school districts and municipalities worldwide.

Applications 

Skyward applications are currently used by school districts and municipalities in 22 U.S. states and multiple international locations. Skyward's student information system and ERP solutions are designed to automate and simplify daily tasks in the areas of student management, financial management, and human resources.

Students' guardians use Skyward's Family Access product to stay up-to-date on students' grades, school schedules, food service accounts, and to communicate with teachers and other district staff.  Students use Skyward's Student Access product to check their own grades and schedules, work on online assignments, and communicate with teachers.

History

1980–2000 
Skyward was founded by Jim King in 1980 in Stevens Point, Wisconsin under the name Jim King and Associates. King worked as a subcontracted employee for a variety of businesses around Wisconsin, writing human resources and accounting software for IBM 5100 computers. In 1981, King wrote software for Merrill Area Public Schools, which was subsequently purchased by three other districts in Wisconsin.

In 1984, Jim King and Associates incorporated as a company and adopted the name School Administrative Software, Incorporated (SASI)

In 1988 and 1992, SASI opened offices in St. Cloud, Minnesota and Bloomington, Illinois, respectively. In 1994, SASI purchased Matrix Computers, a special education administration software company, and SASI changed their name to Skyward, Inc. In 1998 and 1999, Skyward opened offices in Lansing, Michigan and Indiana.

2000–2010 
In 2001, Skyward partnered with the Washington School Information Processing Cooperative (WSIPC) to integrate into 297 districts throughout the state. In 2002, Skyward opened an office in Austin, Texas. In 2006, Skyward partnered with their first international customer, the American Embassy School in New Delhi, India.
In this time, Skyward expanded sales to Utah, Pennsylvania, New Jersey, New Mexico, Tennessee and Florida.

2010–2014 
In 2011 the Texas Education Agency selected Skyward as a preferred vendor of student administrative software for Texas schools. In 2013, Rhode Island and Tennessee education departments both selected Skyward as a preferred vendor of student administrative software for their schools.

2014–present 
In March, 2016, Skyward moved all corporate operations to its new world headquarters building in Stevens Point, WI.

Awards 
 2013, 2015 EdTech Digest Cool Tool Award
 2017, 2018 Bubbler Award

References

External links 
 Official site

Software companies based in Wisconsin
Companies based in Wisconsin
Software companies of the United States